The adjective alethic refers to the various modalities of truth, such as necessity, possibility or impossibility, as in:
 Alethic modality, a modality in linguistics
 Subjunctive or alethic possibility, a form of modality studied in modal logic